The 2004 Cup of China was the fourth event of six in the 2004–05 ISU Grand Prix of Figure Skating, a senior-level international invitational competition series. It was held at the Capital Gymnasium in Beijing on November 11–14. Medals were awarded in the disciplines of men's singles, ladies' singles, pair skating, and ice dancing. Skaters earned points toward qualifying for the 2004–05 Grand Prix Final. The compulsory dance was the Golden Waltz.

Results

Men

Ladies

Pairs

Ice dancing

External links
 2004 Cup of China

Cup Of China, 2004
Cup of
Cup of China
2000s in Beijing
Sports competitions in Beijing